KYAL-FM (97.1 FM, "The Sports Animal") is a radio station licensed to serve Muskogee, Oklahoma.  The station is owned by KMMY, Inc. It airs a sports format.  Its studios are located at the CityPlex Towers in South Tulsa and its transmitter is located near Stigler, Oklahoma.

History 
As KMMY, this station was known as "Y97, Today's Hot New Country" and aired a country music format. Notable on-air personalities included disk jockey Gary Walker and weather forecaster Don Woods.

The station was assigned the KYAL-FM call letters by the Federal Communications Commission on April 3, 2006. The station flipped from country music to all-sports on April 17, 2006, when the "Sports Animal" format moved from KYAL (AM) to KYAL-FM.  The AM station and KBIX simulcast this programming as part of the Sports Animal Network. The station made the change to increase the coverage area and improve the signal as part of a drive to improve ratings.

References

External links

YAL-FM
Sports radio stations in the United States
Muskogee, Oklahoma